A by-election for the seat of Wanguri in the Northern Territory Legislative Assembly was held on 19 August 1989. The by-election was triggered by the resignation of Country Liberal Party (CLP) Cabinet Minister Don Dale. The seat had been held by Dale since its creation in 1983.

Results

References

1989 elections in Australia
Northern Territory by-elections
1980s in the Northern Territory